This page shows the results of the Bowling Competition for men and women at the 2003 Pan American Games, held from August 1 to August 17, 2003 in Santo Domingo, Dominican Republic.

Men's competition

Singles

Doubles

Women's competition

Singles

Doubles

Medal table

References
 Sports 123
 bowlingdigital

2003
Events at the 2003 Pan American Games
2003 in bowling